This is a list of members of the Riksdag, the national parliament of Sweden. The Riksdag is a unicameral assembly with 349 members of parliament, who are elected on a proportional basis to serve fixed terms of four years. In the Riksdag, members are seated per constituency and not party. The following MPs were elected in the 2006 Swedish general election and will serve until the 2010 Swedish general election. Members of the center-right Cabinet of Fredrik Reinfeldt, the ruling coalition during this term, are marked in bold, party leaders of the seven parties represented in the Riksdag in italic.

Composition

List of elected MPs

Members who resigned

Notes

References

External links 
members of the Riksdag in alphabetical order

2006-2010